These are lists of Privy Counsellors of England, Great Britain and the United Kingdom from the reorganisation in 1679 of His Majesty's Most Honourable Privy Council to the present day. Members of the Privy Council of Ireland between 1660 and 1922 and of the Privy Council of Northern Ireland are also listed.

Privy Council of England and Great Britain
 List of Privy Counsellors (1679–1714)
 List of Privy Counsellors (1714–1820)

Privy Council of the United Kingdom
 List of Privy Counsellors (1820–1837)
 List of Privy Counsellors (1837–1901)
 List of Privy Counsellors (1901–1910)
 List of Privy Counsellors (1910–1936)
 List of Privy Counsellors (1936–1952)
 List of Privy Counsellors (1952–2022)
 List of Privy Counsellors (2022–present)

Privy Council of Ireland
 List of Privy Counsellors of Ireland (1660–1922)

Privy Council of Northern Ireland
List of Privy Counsellors of Northern Ireland (1922–1971)

See also

 List of Royal members of the Privy Council
 List of current members of the Privy Council

Sources

 
 Haydn, Joseph Timothy and Ockerby, Horace. The Book of Dignities, 3rd ed. (1894, reprinted Baltimore, 1970).